Damper is a thick homemade soda bread traditionally prepared by early European settlers in Australia. The bread is different from bush bread, which has been made by Indigenous Australians for thousands of years and was traditionally made by crushing a variety of native seeds, nuts and roots, mixing them into a dough, and then baking the dough in the coals of a fire. There is ongoing investigation into whether this technique of various Aboriginal peoples influenced the development of colonial-era damper, similarly cooked in the ashes of a camp fire.

Damper is a bread made from wheat-based dough. Flour, salt and water, with some butter if available, is lightly kneaded and baked in the coals of a campfire, either directly or within a camp oven. When cooked as smaller, individually-sized portions, these damper "bush scones" are often called "johnny cakes". It is uncertain if this name was influenced by the term for North American cornmeal bread. However, Australian johnny cakes, while often pan-fried, remain wheat-based.

Damper was utilised by stockmen who travelled in remote areas for long periods, with only basic rations of flour, sugar and tea, supplemented by whatever meat was available. It was also a basic provision of squatters. The basic ingredients of damper were flour, salt, and water. Baking soda or beer could be used for leavening. Damper was normally cooked in the ashes of the campfire. The ashes were flattened, and the damper was cooked there for ten minutes, often wrapped around a stick. Following this, it was covered with ashes and cooked for another 20 to 30 minutes until it sounded hollow when tapped. Alternatively, damper was cooked in a greased camp oven. Damper was eaten with dried or cooked meat or golden syrup.

Damper is an iconic Australian dish. Other cultures have similar versions of hearth breads, and versions of soda breads are made in camping situations in many parts of the world, including New Zealand and the United Kingdom.

See also
Bush bread
Bush tucker
Tortilla de rescoldo

References

External links

Australian breads
Australian cuisine
Unleavened breads
Wheat dishes